Manikchandra Vajpayee (also spelt as Manikchand Vajpayee) (born: October 7, 1919; death: December 25, 2005), also known as Mamaji was an Indian journalist, writer and RSS Pracharak. He is noted for his contribution to the field of journalism. He was the founder-editor of the multi-edition Hindi daily newspaper Swadesh. The Manikchandra Vajpayee National Journalism Awards, which the Government of Madhya Pradesh named after Manikchandra Vajpayee, is one of India's awards in the field of journalism.

Biography 
Manikchandra Vajpayee was born on October 7, 1919, in Bateshwar of Agra district of Uttar Pradesh, India. He started journalism as the editor of Deshmitra published from Bhind district. He served as the Organizing Secretary of Bharatiya Jana Sangh in 1953. He served as the editor of the daily Hindi newspaper Swadesh (Indore) from 1968 to 1985. In the year 1975, Vajpayee was jailed during The Emergency, but he did not let his writing stop. He was in Indore jail for 19 months. He continued to write editorials from the jail. He was associated with Swadesh since its establishment in 1966. He also served as the advisory editor of Bhopal, Jabalpur, Sagar, Raipur and Bilaspur edition of Swadesh. He was editor-in-chief of Gwalior, Jhansi and Guna edition of Swadesh from 1987 to 2005.

Mamaji was also the President of Indore Press Club from 1978 to 1980. In his tenure, Indore Press Club became quite discussed for his activities. He raised the demand to eliminate the old waste laws through this press club. He died on December 25, 2005, in Indore, Madhya Pradesh.

In October 2020, his biography book, Shabdapurush: Manikchandra Vajpayee was launched by Sarsanghachalak Mohan Bhagwat and Minister of Information and Broadcasting Prakash Javadekar. The book was jointly published by Prabhat Prakashan and Indira Gandhi National Centre for the Arts.

Selected bibliography
 Keral Mein Marks Nahi Mahesh
 Rashtriya Swayamsevak Sangh: Apne Samvidhan Ke Aaine Mein
 Samay Ki Shila Par
 Pahli Agni Pariksha
 Aapatkaleen Sangharsh Ki Gaatha
 Bharatiya Naari: Vivekanand Ki Drishti Se
 Kashmir Ka Kadwa Sach
 Pope Ka Kasta Shikanka
 Jyoti Jala Nij Praan Ki
 Partition-Days The Fiery Saga of RSS

Recognition and commemoration 
In 2005, he was honored with the Dr Hedgewar Pragya Award in Kolkata for his significant contribution in the field of journalism.

In 2006, the State Government of Madhya Pradesh, led by CM Shivraj Singh Chouhan established "Manikchandra Vajpayee National Journalism Award". Later, the award was discontinued by the Congress government. In 2020, the award was restarted by Shivraj Singh Chouhan's government.

In December 2020, the Government of India's postal department issued a postage stamp to commemorate Vajpayee. The postal stamp release ceremony was attended by CM Shivraj Singh Chouhan and former governor Kaptan Singh Solanki.

See also 
 List of Indian journalists

References 

1919 births
2005 deaths
Indian journalists
Indian writers
Rashtriya Swayamsevak Sangh pracharaks
Rashtriya Swayamsevak Sangh members
Journalists from Madhya Pradesh
Bharatiya Jana Sangh politicians
People from Uttar Pradesh
People from Madhya Pradesh